Luis Esteban Nery Hernández (born December 12, 1994) is a Mexican professional boxer. He is a two-weight world champion, having held the WBC and Ring magazine bantamweight titles between 2017 and 2018, and the WBC super bantamweight title from 2020 to May 2021. As of March 2022, Nery is ranked as the worlds fourth best super bantamweight by BoxRec and tenth best by The Ring.

Professional career

Early career
Nery was born and fights out of Tijuana. He only fought 9 amateur bouts, winning all of them. Five of them ended by way of knockout. Nery made his professional debut in May 2012 at the age of 17.

Nery won his first 18 fights before challenging for the vacant WBC Continental bantamweight title against Martín Casillas. Casillas was knocked down twice during the fight as Nery took a unanimous decision (100-88, 99–89, 98–90). Nery's one defense of that regional title came against former interim super flyweight world champion David Sánchez. After an early head clash that threatened to stop the fight, Nery dominated Sánchez landing a series of power punches that broke Sánchez down. The former interim titlist was knocked down in the 5th round and retired on the stool. In December 2016, Nery was knocked down for the first time in his pro career in the first round of a bout against Raymond Tabugon. Despite the knockdown, the fight was mostly one-sided as Nery battered Tabugon until the referee stopped it in the fourth round.

Nery vs. Yamanaka
Although Nery spoke of challenging for a super flyweight title, his first shot at a world title would come against WBC  and The Ring bantamweight champion Shinsuke Yamanaka on August 15, 2017, which he won with a sensational fourth-round stoppage. The bout started with both fighters trading back and forth combinations, but at the start of the fourth round Nery rocked Yamanaka with a left cross. After a brief respite in which Yamanaka seemed to regain control, Nery continued pummeling the defending champion, who was unable to defend himself. Yamanaka's corner eventually rushed into the ring to protect their fighter, giving Nery the win. The fight was seen by an audience of over 7 million in Japan.

On August 24, it was reported that Nery tested positive for zilpaterol, a banned substance. The sample that tested positive was taken on July 27, while three samples that were taken in August tested negative. Nery claimed he had failed the drug test due to food contamination. After Nery's B-sample confirmed the result, The Ring reinstated Yamanaka as their bantamweight champion. The WBC is expected to make a decision regarding their bantamweight title in the near future.

With the WBC yet to make a public ruling, it was announced Nery would be facing Arthur Villanueva in a non-title bout in his hometown, Tijuana, at Estadio Gasmart on November. In front of a crowd of 16,000, Nery defeated Villanueva with a round 6 TKO, despite being knocked down in round 4. Villanueva claimed that the stoppage was "premature".

On October 31, the WBC made its final ruling on Nery's positive test. The sanctioning body concluded that the positive test was due to contaminated food. Consequently, the result of the Yamanaka-Nery title bout wouldn't be overturned but the WBC ordered a rematch, which was eventually scheduled for March.

Nery vs. Yamanaka II
Nery was once again successful in the rematch, claiming victory with a second-round TKO.

From the outset, Yamanaka attempted to box more conservatively from the outside and had some success in this regard. Nery, however, fired back with a series of savage combinations which visibly hurt Yamanaka, before knocking him down with an overhand left.

The following round was more of the same as Nery stalked and attacked continually, knocking Yamanaka down a total of three times before the fight was waved off.

Ultimately, as Nery weighed in three pounds over the bantamweight limit at 121lbs, the WBC bantamweight title was only at stake for Yamanaka and now remains vacant.

Nery vs. Alameda 
On September 26, 2020, Nery faced Aaaron Alameda for the vacant WBC super bantamweight title. Alameda was ranked #6 by the WBC at the time. Nery won the fight via unanimous decision, winning on all three scorecards, 118-110, 116-112 and 115-113.

Nery vs. Figueroa 
In his next fight, Nery fought WBA regular super bantamweight champion Brandon Figueroa in a unification bout. Despite a good start from Nery, Figueroa was the better fighter in the second part of the fight and managed to stop Nery in the seventh round to unify the WBA and WBC super bantamweight titles.

Nery vs. Castro 
In his next fight, Nery fought Carlos Castro, ranked #2 by the WBO, #3 by the WBC and IBF and #13 by the WBA at super bantamweight. Nery dropped Castro in the first round and managed to do enough in the rest of the fight to get a narrow split-decision win over Castro, 96-93, 95-94 and 94-95 on the scorecards in his favor.

Professional boxing record

See also
List of Mexican boxing world champions

References

External links
 
 Luis Nery - Profile, News Archive & Current Rankings at Box.Live

1994 births
Living people
World Boxing Council champions
World bantamweight boxing champions
World boxing champions
Mexican male boxers
Boxers from Baja California
Sportspeople from Tijuana
Doping cases in boxing
Southpaw boxers
21st-century Mexican people